Marcellus Gilmore Edson (February 7, 1849 – March 6, 1940) was a Canadian chemist and pharmacist. In 1884, he patented a way to make peanut paste, an early version of peanut butter.

Biography 
Marcellus Gilmore Edson was born at Bedford in Quebec. Edson promoted the idea of peanut paste as a delicious and nutritious foodstuff for people who could hardly chew solid food, a common state in those days.  In 1884 Edson was awarded United States Patent No. 306727 for the invention. His cooled product had "a consistency like that of butter, lard, or ointment", according to his patent application. He included the mixing of sugar into the paste to harden its consistency.  The patent describes a process of milling roasted peanuts until the peanuts reached "a fluid or semi-fluid state".

References 

1849 births
1940 deaths
Anglophone Quebec people
People from Montérégie
Canadian pharmacists